Ela Lehotská (born 1973) is a Slovak actress. She has appeared in a Czech film Puritptýz and played Bep Voskuijl in the 2001 ABC miniseries Anne Frank: The Whole Story. In 2008, she starred in the film František je děvkař. Besides, Ela is also a stage actress.

Selected performances 
2006 – Miriam in The Floods by Alice Nellis, Theatre on the Balustrade, Prague
2005 – Helen in Under the Blue Sky by David Eldridge, Theatre on the Balustrade, Prague
2002 – Julika Jenkins in Top Dogs by Urs Widmer, HaDivadlo, Brno
2001 – Anne Frank: The Whole Story as Bep Voskuijl

Filmography 
František je děvkař (2008) .... Eliška, František's wife
Mesto tieňov (2008) TV series .... Zuzana Hrubešová (episode Chladnokrvne 25 April 2008)
Private Traps (2008) TV series... Oldřich's girlfriend (episode Smím prosit o lásku?)
La Dame d'Izieu (2007) .... Rachel
Anne Frank: The Whole Story (2001) .... :Bep Voskuijl

References

External links 
 Ela Lehotská at Czechoslovak Film Database
 Ela Lehotská Official Page
 

Living people
1973 births
Czech film actresses
Czech television actresses
Czech stage actresses
Place of birth missing (living people)